Juanita Growing Thunder Fogarty (born 1969) is a Native American, Assiniboine Sioux bead worker and porcupine quill worker. She creates traditional Northern Plains regalia.

Background
Juanita Growing Thunder Fogarty was born in Castro Valley, California in 1969; however, her family comes from the Fort Peck Indian Reservation, where Juanita spent much of her childhood.

Her mother, Joyce Growing Thunder Fogarty, is also an acclaimed bead and quill artist and the only artist to have won best of show three times at the Santa Fe Indian Market. Both artists come from a long line of Plains Indians bead workers. Juanita learned skills from her mother and has been beading since the age of three. At times Juanita will work with her mother Joyce, and her daughter Jessica "Jessa Rae" together beading for larger regalia projects.

Artwork
Fogarty creates traditional Plains clothing and accessories, such as purses, pipe bags, dolls, cradle boards, rifle scabbards, and knife cases – all adorned with beadwork or porcupine quill embroidery.

Her quillwork is labor-intensive. She gathers her own quills from freshly killed porcupines, then washes and dyes them. She uses both synthetic and natural dyes, such as bloodroot, blackberries, and wolf moss. Sorting the quills by color and size is the lengthiest step in the process. The quills are then softened in a bath of warm water, and Fogarty flattens them with her own teeth. She then appliqués or wraps the quills to moose or deer hide to create intricate patterns.

The designs of her artwork are both abstract and realistic and are based on nature, daily life, and the mythology of her tribes. She says that traditional designs of her tribe would, "reflect what the people saw, and what they had going on in their lives at the time ... maybe somebody in their family had gone to war or battle."

Fogarty has won best of class four times at the Santa Fe Indian Market. She also dances at powwows in regalia created by her family over the course of seven years. As of 2006, she lived in North San Juan, California.

Her work is in various permanent museum collections, including the Metropolitan Museum of Art, the Smithsonian's National Museum of the American Indian, and more.

In 2019, her piece Give Away Horses (created in collaboration with her mother and daughter) was included in the exhibition "Heart of Our People: Native Women Artists" at the Minneapolis Institute of Art.

See also
List of Native American artists
Visual arts by indigenous peoples of the Americas

Notes

Native American bead artists
Native American textile artists
Assiniboine people
1969 births
Living people
21st-century Native Americans
American textile artists
Women beadworkers
Women textile artists
20th-century Native Americans
20th-century American artists
20th-century American women artists
21st-century American artists
21st-century American women artists
People from Castro Valley, California
Artists from California
Artists from Montana
20th-century textile artists
20th-century Native American women
21st-century Native American women
Native American people from California
21st-century textile artists